Ishku-ye Pain (also Romanized as Īshkūh-e Pā’īn; also known as Pā’īn Īshkūh) is a village in Deylaman Rural District, Deylaman District, Siahkal County, Gilan Province, Iran. At the 2006 census, its population was 43, in 17 families.

References 

Populated places in Siahkal County